Jacques Reclus (27 July 1796 – 8 April 1882) was a French Protestant minister.

Life
Following studies in Bordeaux, he worked as a librarian at Château de Bonzac, home of Elie Decazes (1780-1860), minister of Louis XVIII. From 1819 he studied theology in Montauban, becoming ordained as pastor at Nimes in December 1821. Afterwards he served as a minister in La Roche-Chalais (1822), then Montcaret (1824).

In June 1831 he resigned as pastor and instructor at the Protestant college in Sainte-Foy-la-Grande in order to head an independent evangelical community in Castétarbe. In 1850 he founded a home for the aged in Orthez.

Family
Reclus was the father of fourteen children who survived beyond infancy, including five sons who gained distinction during their careers:
 Élie Reclus (1827-1904), journalist and political activist
 Élisée Reclus (1830-1905), geographer and political activist
 Onésime Reclus (1837-1916), geographer
 Armand Reclus (1843-1927), geographer and explorer
 Paul Reclus (surgeon) (1847-1914).

Publications 
 Scènes d’une pauvre vie; Pau 1858.

References 
 Les Protestants by André Encrevé (biography in French)
 Parts of this article are based on an equivalent article at the French Wikipedia, namely: Bulletin du Centre d’Étude du Protestantisme Béarnais, numéro 40 ; décembre 2006.

French Calvinist and Reformed ministers
People from Dordogne
1796 births
1882 deaths
Jacques